Suomussalmi Airfield is an airfield in Suomussalmi, Finland, about  southwest of Suomussalmi centre.

See also
List of airports in Finland

References

External links
 VFR Suomi/Finland – Suomussalmi Airfield
 Lentopaikat.net – Suomussalmi Airfield 

Airports in Finland
Airfield
Buildings and structures in Kainuu